Wavre Sports FC is a Belgian association football club located in the municipality of Wavre, Walloon Brabant. It was founded in Jette, Brussels in 1944 as Racing Club Jette, and registered with the Belgian Football Association the following year under the matriculation n°4549.  It merged in 1970 with Royal Stade de Bruxelles to become Racing Jet de Bruxelles.  In 1988 the club moved to Wavre and became Racing Jet Wavre, finally changing its name to Wavre Sports FC following the 2017–18 season.

History
The club reached the second division in 1979 as Racing Jet de Bruxelles and finished 5th that year, qualifying for the final round.  It played one season in the third division in 1982–83 and achieved promotion twice in two seasons to play the first division in 1984–85 (finished last).  Two years later, it was back in the first division for two seasons this time.  In 1988, the club was relegated to the second division and moved to Wavre. As a result of finishing last in the 2019/2020 season Wavre Sports FC has been relegated from the Belgian Third Amateur Division.

Honours
Belgian Second Division Final Round:
Winners (2):

References

  Official website

 
Association football clubs established in 1944
1944 establishments in Belgium
Football clubs in Belgium
Defunct football clubs in Brussels
Sport in Walloon Brabant
Jette
Wavre
Belgian Pro League clubs